Nuzhat is an Arabic name.

Notable people with Nuzhat as a given name 
Nuzhat Husain, Indian pathologist
Nuzhat Katzav, Israeli politician
Nuzhat Parween, Indian cricketer
Nuzhat Pathan, Pakistani politician
Nuzhat Sadiq, Pakistani politician
Nuzhat Tasnia, Bangladesh

Notable people with Nuzhat as a surname 
Shaista Nuzhat, Punjabi linguist